Marc-Antoine Labbé-Fortin (born August 28, 1987) is a Canadian football defensive lineman. He was drafted 20th overall by the Tiger-Cats in the 2011 CFL Draft, but elected to play out his final year of college eligibility at Laval and finish his education. He signed with Hamilton on March 28, 2012. He played CIS football for the Laval Rouge et Or.

References

External links
Hamilton Tiger-Cats bio

1987 births
Living people
Canadian football defensive linemen
French Quebecers
Hamilton Tiger-Cats players
Laval Rouge et Or football players
Players of Canadian football from Quebec
Sportspeople from Quebec City